Fredrik Elster Schreiner (27 January 1905 – 11 May 1988) was a Norwegian civil servant.

He was born in Drøbak, and moved to Kristiania at the age of ten. He studied law, and graduated with the cand.jur. degree in 1928. In his youth he was a member of the revolutionary group Mot Dag.

He was hired as a secretary in the National Insurance Administration in 1934. He worked there for one year, and then worked in the Ministry of Justice and for the chief administrative officer of finances in Aker municipality. In 1948 he was hired as the chief administrative officer of communications in Oslo, a position he held until 1973. He was also involved in the Norwegian development aid project in Kerala, the first such project in Norway. In 1984 he released the book Oslo Gassverk 1848–1978.

Together with Signy Rønneberg (1903–1983) he had a son Per Schreiner, a notable economist and civil servant. Schreiner was himself the son of Kristian and Alette Schreiner and a brother of Johan Schreiner. Fredrik Schreiner died in 1988.

References

1905 births
1988 deaths
Mot Dag
Norwegian civil servants
Norwegian non-fiction writers
20th-century Norwegian writers
20th-century non-fiction writers
People from Frogn